Yate and Pickup Bank is a civil parish in Blackburn with Darwen, Lancashire, England.  It contains three buildings that are recorded in the National Heritage List for England as designated listed buildings, all of which are listed at Grade II.  This grade is the lowest of the three gradings given to listed buildings and is applied to "buildings of national importance and special interest".  The parish contains the settlements of Pickup Bank and Bank Fold, and part of the village of Belthorn, but is otherwise rural.  The listed buildings consist of two farmhouses, and a Sunday school that was later converted into a chapel.

Buildings

References

Citations

Sources

Buildings and structures in Blackburn with Darwen
Lists of listed buildings in Lancashire